Fencing was featured in the Commonwealth Games official programme from 1950 to 1970.

Since 1970, as the Commonwealth Games Federation recognised sport, the Commonwealth Fencing Championships have been held every four years, in the same year as the Commonwealth Games.

Editions

Events

All-time medal table

See also
List of Commonwealth Games medallists in fencing

External links
Commonwealth Games sport index

 
Sports at the Commonwealth Games
Commonwealth Games